This list represents all of the 146 United States military personnel who received the Medal of Honor for valor in combat during the Korean War. 103 Medals of Honor were awarded posthumously.

The Korean War was an escalation of border clashes between two rival Korean regimes (each of which was supported by external powers) with the North Korean regime trying to topple the South Korean regime through political and guerrilla tactics. In a very narrow sense, some may refer to it as a civil war, though many other factors were at play. After failing to strengthen their cause in the free elections held in South Korea during May 1950 and the refusal of South Korea to hold new elections per North Korean demands, the communist North Korean Army moved south on June 25, 1950 to attempt to reunite the Korean peninsula, which had been formally divided since 1948. The conflict was then expanded by the Chinese and the Soviet Union's involvement as part of the larger Cold War. The main hostilities were during the period from June 25, 1950 until the armistice was signed on July 27, 1953.

Korean War

Medal of Honor recipients

The Medal of Honor was created during the American Civil War and is the highest military decoration presented by the United States government to a member of its armed forces. The recipient must have distinguished themselves at the risk of their own life above and beyond the call of duty in action against an enemy of the United States.

Korean War Medal of Honor recipients by service branch

US Air Force – 4
US Army – 93
US Marine Corps – 42
US Navy – 7

Korean War Medal of Honor recipients

 indicates that the recipient was killed in action.
Note: Notes in quotations are derived or are copied from the official Medal of Honor citation

See also
 List of Medal of Honor recipients
 The American Unknown Soldier from the Korean War

References
General
 
 
 

Inline

Lists of Medal of Honor recipients

Medal of Honor recipients
Medal of Honor recipients